The Discovery Aviation Model 201 aka Avia Accord 201 is a light utility aircraft that was re-introduced in 2013.

Design and development
The Model 201 is a high-wing twin engine fixed tricycle gear aircraft with twin rudders. The aircraft was designed by Avia Ltd of Moscow, Russia as the Avia Accord 201. The aircraft was produced in the Sokol plant at Nizhny Novgorod. The aircraft features rear clamshell doors that can be removed, and has flown with an outrigger floats. The aircraft has been modified with updated avionics to be marketed for western sales by Discovery Aviation.

Specifications (Model 201)

References

About Discovery 201 - Aviation's New Aerial Pickup Truck 2013
Experimental aircraft
High-wing aircraft
Twin-engined tractor aircraft
Aircraft first flown in 1997
Twin-tail aircraft
1990s Soviet and Russian civil utility aircraft